The Tasin House at 202 N. Wheeler in Victoria, Texas was built in 1911 by building contractors Bailey Mills.  It was designed by Praeger & Hull.  It was listed on the National Register of Historic Places in 1986.

It is a two-story vernacular house with an "imposing" two-story porch.  It has some tapered box columns.

It was listed on the NRHP as part of a study which listed numerous historic resources in the Victoria area.

See also

National Register of Historic Places listings in Victoria County, Texas

References

Houses on the National Register of Historic Places in Texas
Houses completed in 1911
Houses in Victoria, Texas
National Register of Historic Places in Victoria, Texas